Vitis yunnanensis (known locally as yun nan pu tao, meaning Yunnan grape) is a species of liana in the grape family native to the Chinese  province of Yunnan (in Jingdong Yi Autonomous County and Jinghong). It is a forest dweller, found at various elevations between 500 and 1800 meters. In August it bears globular berries.

References

yunnanensis
Plants described in 1997
Flora of China